David Gulledge (born October 26, 1967) is a former American football safety in the National Football League for the Washington Redskins.  He played college football at Jacksonville State University and was drafted in the eleventh round of the 1991 NFL Draft.

He was a quarterback at Jacksonville State.

References

1967 births
Living people
People from Pell City, Alabama
American football safeties
Jacksonville State Gamecocks football players
Washington Redskins players